Engina tuberculosa is a species of small sea snail, a marine gastropod mollusk in the family Pisaniidae.

Description

Distribution

References

 Pease W. H. (1863). Description of new species of marine shells from the Pacific Islands. Proceedings of the Zoological Society of London. (1862): 240–243.
 Marine molluscs in the Cuming collection, British Museum (Natural History) described by William Harper Pease.

External links

Pisaniidae
Gastropods described in 1863